Regimbartia attenuata, commonly known as Japanese water scavenger beetle, is a species of water scavenger beetle widely distributed in the Old World, from northern Australia
and Japan westward to the countries of Arabian Peninsula, including Oman and Yemen. It is the only species of the genus occurring in the Arabian Peninsula.

Distribution
It is found in India, Sri Lanka, Pakistan, Philippines, Sunda Islands, Australia, Japan, Formosa, Indonesia, Cambodia, Cochin-china and Indochina.

Description
The larval stage of the species is extensively described. Adult female lay eggs in egg cases on substrate such as leaves. Larva has almost symmetrical clypeolabrum, elongated prementum. Third instar larva is metapneustic. Body slender with strong setiferous projections. Thorax and abdomen consists with short to long, membranous projections. Body greyish white in color with brownish sclerotised parts. Head capsule is yellowish brown which is subquadrate, attenuated posteriad. Cervical sclerites are large, and subrectangular. Long, slender antenna with 3 segments. Mandibles slender, and slightly asymmetrical. Maxilla consists with 6-segments, and are slightly longer than antenna. Thoracic membrane covered with fine cuticular pubescence. Abdomen with 10 segments and tapering posteriorly. There are 12 setiferous, membranous projections on abdomen.

Adult beetles have antennae composed of 8 segments (5+3).

Biology
The species is an important link in the diet of many amphibians. Adult beetles were easily eaten by the frog species Pelophylax nigromaculatus, but about 90% of swallowed beetles are excreted quickly. Surprisingly, the beetles survive.Water beetles carry oxygen under their exoskeleton. The exoskeleton protects the beetle from digestive juices in the frog. It allows the beetle to survive in the digestive system of the frog.

Adult beetles are identified as the natural hosts of the fungus Autoicomyces falcifer. Adults are usually found from rabbit carcasses.

References 

Hydrophilidae
Insects of Sri Lanka
Insects described in 1801